Dardan Dehari (born 23 August 1990) is a Macedonian alpine ski racer of Albanian descent.

He competed at the 2015 World Championships in Beaver Creek, USA, in the giant slalom.

References

External links

1990 births
Living people
Macedonian male alpine skiers
Place of birth missing (living people)
Date of birth missing (living people)
Sportspeople from Tetovo
Albanians in North Macedonia